Felino is a comune (municipality) in the Province of Parma in the Italian region Emilia-Romagna, located about  west of Bologna and about  southwest of Parma. As of 2011 it had a population of 8,621.

History
The town developed around the castle, built in 9th century, and the municipality was established in 1806. The town is the traditional home of Salame di Felino, along with other cities in Parma.

Geography
Felino is in the western area of the Province of Parma, and its territory is part of the Boschi di Carrega Nature Park. The municipality borders with Calestano, Langhirano, Parma and Sala Baganza.

It counts 13 hamlets (frazioni):

Main sights
The main attractions are a castle, Castello di Felino  (dating to the 9th century AD and destroyed by Ludovico Sforza in 1483, but now restored) and the museum of salami, a typical food of the area.

Twin towns
 Cumières, France

References

External links

 Official website 
Felino: Google Map on Panoramio

Cities and towns in Emilia-Romagna